Baramkeh, named after Barmakids, is a neighborhood and district of the Qanawat municipality of Damascus, Syria. It had a population of 14,969 in the 2004 census. The neighborhood was founded during the late 19th century, during Ottoman rule. A military secondary school was established in Baramkeh in 1890s. The district contains a campus of the Damascus University.

References

Neighborhoods of Damascus